The Women's Africa Volleyball Championship U18 is a sport competition for national teams with women players under 18 years, currently held biannually and organized by the African Volleyball Confederation, the Africa volleyball federation.

Summaries

MVP by edition
2008 – 
2011 – 
2013 – 
2014 –

See also
Men's U19 African Volleyball Championship

References

External links
 Girl's U18 Volleyball African Championship Archive - todor66.com
 2008 Women’s junior African Nations Championship

Afr
Afr
Afr
African Volleyball Championships
Women's African Volleyball Championship